This list of metro systems includes electrified rapid transit train systems worldwide. In some parts of the world, metro systems are referred to as subways, U-Bahn or undergrounds. , 194 cities in 61 countries have a metro system. 

The London Underground first opened as an underground railway in 1863 and its first electrified underground line opened in 1890, making it the world's oldest metro system. The New York City Subway has the greatest number of stations with 472. The country with the most metro systems is China, with 47 in operation.

Considerations
The International Association of Public Transport (L'Union Internationale des Transports Publics, or UITP) defines metro systems as urban passenger transport systems, "operated on their own right of way and segregated from general road and pedestrian traffic". The terms heavy rail (mainly in North America) and heavy urban rail are essentially synonymous with the term "metro". Heavy rail systems are also specifically defined as an "electric railway".

The dividing line between metro and other modes of public transport, such as light rail and commuter rail, is not always clear, and while UITP only makes distinctions between "metros" and "light rail", the American Public Transportation Association (APTA) and Federal Transit Administration (FTA) distinguish all three modes. A common way to distinguish metro from light rail is by their separation from other traffic. While light rail systems may share roads or have level crossings, a metro system runs, almost always, on a grade-separated exclusive right-of-way, with no access for pedestrians and other traffic. And in contrast to commuter rail or light rail, metro systems are primarily used for transport within a city, and have higher service frequencies and substantially higher passenger volume capacities. Furthermore, most metro systems do not share tracks with freight trains or inter-city rail services. It is however not relevant whether the system runs on steel wheels or rubber tyres, or if the power supply is from a third rail or overhead line.

The name of the system is not a criterion for inclusion or exclusion. Some cities use metro as a brand name for a transit line with no component of rapid transit whatsoever. Similarly, there are systems branded light rail that meet every criterion for being a rapid transit system. Some systems also incorporate light metro or light rail lines as part of the larger system under a common name. These are listed, but the light rail lines are not counted in the provided network data. Certain transit networks may match the service standards of metro systems, but reach far out of the city and are sometimes known as S-Bahn, suburban, regional or commuter rail. These are not included in this list. Neither are funicular systems, or people movers, such as amusement park, ski resort and airport transport systems.

This list counts metros separately when multiple metros in one city or metropolitan area have separate owners or operating companies. This list expressly does not aim at representing the size and scope of the total rapid transit network of a certain city or metropolitan area. The data of this list should not be used to infer the size of a city's, region's, or country's urban rail transit systems, or to establish a ranking.

Legend

 City Primary city served by the metro system.
 Country Sovereign state in which the metro system is located.
 Name The most common English name of the metro system (including a link to the article for that system).
 Year opened The year the metro system was opened for commercial service at metro standards. In other words, parts of the system may be older, but as parts of a former light rail or commuter rail network, so the year that the system obtained metro standards (most notably electrification) is the one listed.
 Year of last expansion The last time the system length or number of stations in the metro system was expanded.
 Stations The number of stations in the metro network, with stations connected by transfer counted as one.
 System lengthThe system length of a metro network is the sum of the lengths of all routes in the rail network in kilometers or miles. Each route is counted only once, regardless of how many lines pass over it, and regardless of whether it is single-track or multi-track, single carriageway or dual carriageway.
 Ridership The number of unique journeys on the metro system every year. There is a major discrepancy between the ridership figures: some metro systems count transferring between lines as multiple journeys, but others do not.

List

; Table notes
 Indicates ridership figures based on the fiscal year rather than the calendar year.

 Table notes
 Indicates ridership figures based on the fiscal year rather than the calendar year.

List by country

Under construction

The following is a list of new worldwide metro systems that are currently actively under construction. Note that in some cases it is not clear if the system will be considered a full metro system once it begins operational service. Only metro systems under construction are listed where there are no metro systems currently in operation in the same city.

The countries of Ecuador, Ivory Coast, and Serbia are currently constructing their first ever metro systems.

See also

 List of suburban and commuter rail systems
 List of airport people mover systems
 List of bus rapid transit systems
 List of automated train systems
 List of funicular railways
 List of monorail systems
 Medium-capacity rail system
 List of premetro systems
 List of rapid transit systems by track gauge
 List of tram and light rail transit systems
 List of town tramway systems
 List of trolleybus systems

Notes

System notes

Ridership notes

References

System references

Ridership references

Under construction system references

Sources

Bibliography

Online resources

External links
 
 
 European Metropolitan Transport Authorities (EMTA)
 Metro List at CityRailTransit.com website
 Openstreetmap subway project

Rapid transit systems
Rapid transit